Wael Badr (born 1 December 1978) is an Egyptian retired basketball player. He is a member of the Egypt national basketball team.

Badr signed with Al-Gezira for the 2009–10 season after spending the last several years with Al Zamalek in the Egyptian Super League.

National team career
Badr played with the Egypt national basketball team and participated at FIBA AfroBasket in 2007,  2009 and 2013.  Badr averaged 10.6 PPG and 3.1 APG as one of the few consistent performers on the 2009 Egypt team that finished a disappointing tenth place; this was Egypt's worst ever finish in 19 appearances at the tournament and had some fans calling for a complete dismantling of the team. He also played in the 2014 FIBA Basketball World Cup, his last tournament before retiring from national team duty.

References

External links

1978 births
Living people
Egyptian men's basketball players
Point guards
Shooting guards
2014 FIBA Basketball World Cup players
Gezira basketball players
Alexandria Sporting Club players
People from Giza